Brahe is the name of two closely related Scanian noble families.

Brahe may also refer to:

People with the surname 
 Aurora Wilhelmina Brahe (1778–1852), Swedish lady-in-waiting and politically active salonist
 Ebba Brahe (1596–1674), Swedish countess, landowner and courtier
 Elsa Beata Brahe (1629–1653), Swedish countess and duchess
 Elsa Elisabeth Brahe (1632–1689), Swedish countess and duchess
 Erik Brahe (1722–1756), Swedish count
 Gustaf Brahe (1558–1615), Swedish riksråd and Polish field marshal
 Jørgen Thygesen Brahe (1515–1565), Danish nobleman
 Karen Brahe (1657–1736), Danish aristocrat and book collector
 Louise Bille-Brahe (1830–1910), Danish courtier
 Magnus Brahe (1564–1633), Swedish nobleman
 Magnus Brahe (1790–1844), Swedish statesman and soldier
 Margareta Brahe (1603–1669), Swedish aristocrat and court official
 Margareta Brahe (1559–1638), Swedish courtier
 May Brahe (1884–1956), Australian composer
 Nils Brahe (1604–1632), Swedish soldier
 Otte Brahe (1518–1571), Danish nobleman and statesman
 Otte Steensen Brahe (1578–1651), Danish landowner and money lender
 Per Brahe the Elder (1520–1590), Swedish statesman
 Per Brahe the Younger (1602–1680), Swedish soldier, statesman and author
 Sigrid Brahe (1568–1608), Swedish countess
 Sophia Brahe (1556/1559–1643), Danish noble woman
 Steen Ottesen Brahe (1523–1677), Danish military officer and landowner
 Steen Ottesen Brahe (1547–1620), Danish privy counsellor and landowner
 Tycho Brahe (1546–1601), Danish nobleman, astronomer and writer
 William Brahe, Australian explorer; see Burke and Wills expedition

Other uses 
 Brda (river) (German: Brahe), in Poland
 Brahe (planet), an extrasolar planet
 Brahe Basket, a Swedish basketball team
 Brahe Church, in Sweden
 Brahe Djäknar, a Finnish choir
 Brahe House, in Augusta, Georgia, U.S.
 MS Brahe, a vessel
 Anne Claire, Brenna and Tycho Brahe, characters in the webcomic Penny Arcade

See also 
 
 Jørgen Brahe (disambiguation)
 Magnus Brahe (disambiguation)
 Per Brahe (disambiguation)
 Steen Ottesen Brahe (disambiguation)
 Tycho Brahe (disambiguation)